Visa requirements for Central African Republic citizens are administrative entry restrictions by the authorities of other states placed on citizens of Central African Republic.  Central African Republic citizens had visa-free or visa on arrival access to 49 countries and territories, ranking the Central African Republic passport 94th in terms of travel freedom (tied with Algeria) according to the Henley Passport Index.

Visa requirements map

Visa requirements

Dependent, disputed, or restricted territories

Unrecognized or partially recognized countries

Dependent and autonomous territories

Non-visa restrictions

See also

Visa policy of Central African Republic
Central African Republic passport

References and Notes
References

Notes

Central African Republic transport-related lists
Central African Republic
Foreign relations of the Central African Republic